Chris Garner may refer to:

Chris Garner (basketball) (born 1975), American basketball player
Chris Garner (kickboxing) (born 1985), Australian Super Welterweight kickboxer of British descent
Chris Garner (tennis) (born 1969), American tennis player

See also
Chris Gardner (disambiguation)
Christie Garner (born 1973), American volleyball player